Øyestad is a former municipality in the old Aust-Agder county in Norway.  The  municipality existed from 1838 until 1992 when it was merged into the present-day municipality of Arendal which is now located in Agder county. At the time of its dissolution, the municipality of Øyestad encompassed most of the coastline between the towns of Grimstad and Arendal, along with the forested areas along the Nidelva river heading inland. Back in 1838, however, the municipality was far larger in size. The administrative centre was the village of Bjorbekk near the Bjorbekk Church.

History
The parish of Øiestad was established as a municipality on 1 January 1838 (see formannskapsdistrikt law). In 1846, the southern district of Øiestad (population: 2,806) was split off to form the new municipality of Fjære. The municipality was again split in 1850 when the northern district of Øiestad (population: 1,976) was separated to become the municipality of Froland. After that, Øiestad had 5,215 inhabitants. On 1 January 1875, an area of the neighboring town of Arendal (population: 52) was transferred to Øyestad.  Then on 1 January 1881, the island of Hisøya and its small, surrounding islands (population: 2,652) were separated to form the new municipality of Hisøy. This left Øiestad with a population of 4,474. In the early 1900s, the spelling of the name was changed to Øyestad. In 1936, an area of Øyestad (population: 33) was transferred to neighboring Austre Moland municipality.

During the 1960s, there were many municipal mergers across Norway due to the work of the Schei Committee. On 1 January 1962, the uninhabited area of Salvestjønn was transferred from Øyestad to the neighboring municipality of Landvik. On 1 January 1992, there was another large municipal merger. Øyestad (population: 8,679) was merged with the municipalities of Hisøy (population: 4,026), Tromøy (population: 4,711), Moland (population: 8,148), and the town of Arendal (population: 12,478) to form a new, much larger municipality of Arendal.

Name
The municipality (originally the parish) is named after the old Øiestad farm, since the first Øyestad Church was built there.

Coat of arms
The coat of arms was granted on 19 April 1985 and it was in use until the dissolution of the municipality on 1 January 1992. The official blazon is "Argent, a pile issuant from base sinister wavy azure". This means the arms have a field (background) with a tincture of argent which means it is commonly colored white, but if it is made out of metal, then silver is used. The charge is a pile (triangular figure) with wavy edges that runs diagonally across the arms. The design is meant to represent the local river Nidelva as it runs from the mountains into the fjord as it passes through the municipality as it widens as it approaches the sea. The river has played an important role in the local economy. The arms were designed by Ulf Skauge.

Government
The municipal council  of Øyestad was made up of 33 representatives that were elected to four year terms. The party breakdown of the final municipal council was as follows:

Attractions

Øyestad Church
Øyestad Church (Øyestad kirke) is a medieval, Gothic nave church. The church built in stone with 300 seats. Dating is uncertain, but it is generally assumed that it was built around the year 1200. The congregation celebrated the church's 800th anniversary in 2000. Øyestad was formerly the main church for several parishes: Øyestad, Fjære, Grimstad, Froland, and Hisøy. The church was damaged by fire in 1900. The choir, sacristy, tower, altarpiece and pulpit were destroyed along with the paintings on the walls. The church was restored and rededicated in 1902. In 2008, the church underwent extensive restoration.

Notable residents
Peter Munch Brager (born 1806), the vicar of Øyestad
Brit Hoel (born 1942), a politician
Ole Olsen Risholt (born 1809)
Niels Rosenkrantz (1757−1824), a diplomat and prime minister of Denmark-Norway

See also
List of former municipalities of Norway

References

External links

Populated places established in 1838
Populated places disestablished in 1992
Former municipalities of Norway
Arendal
1838 establishments in Norway
1992 disestablishments in Norway